Vladimir Gjoni (born 15 January 1970) is an Albanian football manager and former player.

Managerial career
He was put in charge of hometown club Burreli in December 2013 and in June 2014, Gjoni's contract as coach was extended after steering the club to safety in his first half season at the club. In December 2018, he was appointed manager of Besëlidhja Lezhë.

He succeeded Gentian Begeja as manager of Erzeni Shijak in October 2019.

References

1970 births
Living people
People from Mat (municipality)
Albanian footballers
Association football forwards
KS Kastrioti players
KF Laçi players
KS Burreli players
KS Shkumbini Peqin players
Luftëtari Gjirokastër players
KS Lushnja players
Besëlidhja Lezhë players
Flamurtari Vlorë players
Kategoria Superiore players
Kategoria e Parë players
Albanian football managers
KS Burreli managers
Luftëtari Gjirokastër managers
Besëlidhja Lezhë managers
Kategoria e Parë managers